The Military ranks of Zambia are the military insignia used by the Zambian Defence Force. Zambia is a landlocked country, and does therefore not possess a navy. Zambia shares a rank structure similar to that of the United Kingdom.

Commissioned officer ranks
The rank insignia of commissioned officers.

Other ranks
The rank insignia of non-commissioned officers and enlisted personnel.

References

External links
 

Zambia
Military of Zambia